Polyaddition (or addition polymerisation ) is a polymerization reaction that forms polymers via individual independent addition reactions. Polyaddition occurs as a reaction between functional groups on  molecules with low degrees of polymerization, such as dimers, trimers and oligomers, to form species of higher molar mass. Only at nearly complete conversions does the polymer form, as in polycondensation and in contrast to chain polymerization.

A typical polyaddition is the formation of a polyurethane.

References

Polymer chemistry